Marek Michał Wikiński (born 23 May 1966 in Sochaczew) is a Polish politician. He was elected to the Sejm on 25 September 2005, getting 8,671 votes in 17 Radom district as a candidate from the Democratic Left Alliance list.

He was also a member of Sejm 1997-2001 and Sejm 2001-2005.

See also
Members of Polish Sejm 2005-2007

External links
Marek Wikiński - parliamentary page - includes declarations of interest, voting record, and transcripts of speeches.

1966 births
Living people
Democratic Left Alliance politicians
Members of the Polish Sejm 1997–2001
University of Białystok alumni
Members of the Polish Sejm 2001–2005
Members of the Polish Sejm 2005–2007
Members of the Polish Sejm 2007–2011